The 1989–90 Toronto Maple Leafs season was Toronto's 73rd season in the National Hockey League (NHL). The Maple Leafs had their first non-losing season since the 1978–79 NHL season. Gary Leeman became the second member of the Maple Leafs to score 50 goals in one season.

Off-season
Newly acquired defenceman Rob Ramage is named team captain. Ramage assumes a role that has been vacant for three seasons.

NHL Entry Draft

Regular season
On the power play, the Maple Leafs scored 81 goals on 348 advantages for a 23.3% success rate. This ranked fourth overall in the NHL. The Maple Leafs allowed 17 shorthanded goals on 348 advantages, which ranked 20th in the league. Against the power play, the Maple Leafs allowed 89 goals on 408 advantages, which ranked 15th in the league. The Maple Leafs scored 16 shorthanded goals, third-best in the league. Dave Reid was influential by scoring four shorthanded goals.

Eddie Olczyk reached 30 goals for the third straight year. Olczyk tied a Maple Leafs scoring record by scoring at least 1 point in 18 consecutive games. It was the NHL's third longest scoring streak of the season. The streak was snapped on January 10 in a game against the New York Islanders. During the streak, Olczyk had 11 goals and 17 assists.

Offensively, the Leafs scored 337 goals and 889 points, the most ever by a Leafs team in a season. They had four 30-goal scorers.

Season standings

Schedule and results

Player statistics

Regular season
Scoring

Goaltending

Playoffs
Scoring

Goaltending

Playoffs

Transactions
The Maple Leafs have been involved in the following transactions during the 1989-90 season.

Trades

Free agents

Awards and records
 Fewest Ties in One Season, 4 ties
 Most Goals Scored in One Season, 337 goals 
 Most Penalty Minutes in One Season, 2,419 penalty minutes 
 Gary Leeman, Molson Cup (Most game star selections for Toronto Maple Leafs)
 Al Iafrate, Defense, NHL All-Star Game

References
 Maple Leafs on Hockey Database
 Game Log at Database Hockey

Toronto Maple Leafs seasons
Toronto Maple Leafs season, 1989-90
Tor